Acceptor may refer to:
 Acceptor (accounting), the addressee of a bill of exchange
 In the Indian Contract Act of 1872, the acceptor is the person to whom a proposal is made, and who has communicated his or her acceptance of the said proposal
 Electron acceptor, in chemistry an atom or compound to which electrons are donated during the formation of a coordinate covalent bond 
 Acceptor (semiconductors)
 Acceptor (finite-state machine), in sequential logic a type of finite-state machine
 Medieval English term for a hawk, from the latin accipiter meaning any of several species of hawks, probably from acu-peter, "swift-flying"